Tamara Cohn Eskenazi is The Effie Wise Ochs Professor of Biblical Literature and History at the Reform Jewish seminary Hebrew Union College-Jewish Institute of Religion in Los Angeles.

She was the first woman hired by the Hebrew Union College-Jewish Institute of Religion as a full-time tenure track faculty member for their rabbinical school in 1990, and became the first female tenured full professor in their rabbinical school in 1995.

She was also the chief editor of The Torah: A Women’s Commentary (Andrea Weiss was associate editor), which won the 2008 Jewish Book of the Year Award from the Jewish Book Council.

On May 19, 2013, Eskenazi was ordained as a rabbi by the Hebrew Union College-Jewish Institute of Religion.

Recognition
In 2011, Eskenazi and the late Tikva Frymer-Kensky won the 2011 National Jewish Book Award in Women’s Studies for The JPS Bible Commentary: Ruth. 

The art exhibit “Holy Sparks”, which opened in February 2022 at the Heller Museum and the Skirball Museum, featured 24 Jewish women artists, who had each created an artwork about a female rabbi who was a first in some way. Carol Hamoy created the artwork about Eskenazi.

Selected works
 In an age of prose : a literary approach to Ezra-Nehemiah, 1986
 Second Temple studies. Temple and community in the Persian period , 1991
 The Torah : a women's commentary , 2008
 Ruth : the traditional Hebrew text with the new JPS translation , 2011

References

Year of birth missing (living people)
Living people
American biblical scholars
Jewish American academics
Judaic scholars
Reform women rabbis
Rabbis from Los Angeles
Old Testament scholars
Female biblical scholars
21st-century Jewish biblical scholars
21st-century American rabbis